John Edmonds (by 1503–1544), of the Middle Temple, London and Little Waltham, Essex, was an English politician.

Family
Edmonds had four sons and two daughters by his wife, Mary.

Career
He was a Member (MP) of the Parliament of England for Maldon in 1539.

References

1544 deaths
English MPs 1539–1540
Members of Parliament for Maldon
Year of birth uncertain